The 171 Edward Street is a future residential skyscraper to be located at 171 Edward Street on the corner with Elizabeth Street in Brisbane, Queensland, Australia. The tower will rise to 265m (274m AHD) which is currently the maximum height allowed in Brisbane central business district.

The 81-storey tower will include 642 apartments; 313 one bedroom, 219 two-bedroom, 110 three-bedroom apartments. Recreation area with pool, gym and games room will be located on levels 4 and 5. Retail space is planned for the ground and mezzanine levels.

Development application, lodged with the Brisbane City Council in December 2015, was approved in May 2016.
As of 2019, approval expires in June 2020, Aria's commercial manager Michael Zaicek told Commercial Real Estate that they “have no intentions for a residential development in the near future”

See also

List of tallest buildings in Brisbane

References

External links
 Building at The Skyscraper Center database 

Skyscrapers in Brisbane
Residential skyscrapers in Australia
Proposed skyscrapers in Australia
Edward Street, Brisbane